The  is a large Buddhist statue located in Shōhō-ji in Gifu City, Gifu Prefecture, Japan. It was conceived by the 11th head priest of Kinpouzan Shōhō temple, Ichyuu, around 1790, in hopes of averting large earthquakes and famines. Ichyuu died in 1815 before it was completed, but his successor, Priest Kohshuu completed it in April 1832, after 38 years of construction. It is one of the three great Buddha portrait statues in Japan.

Construction 
The Great Buddha of Gifu is unique due to the method of its construction. First, a central pillar 1.8 meters in circumference was formed from ginkgo tree wood. The Buddha's shape was then formed using bamboo lattices. The bamboo was covered with clay to add shape and many Buddhist scriptures were then placed upon the clay. Finally, the scriptures were covered in lacquer and gold leaf, giving the Buddha the appearance that it has today.

Measurements 
 Height of Statue: 
 Length of Face: 
 Length of Eyes: 
 Length of Ears: 
 Width of Mouth: 
 Height of Nose:

Access 
From JR Gifu Station (Bus Platform 11) or Meitetsu Gifu Station (Bus Platform 4), board any bus towards Nagara. Get off the bus at "Gifu Koen, Rekishi Hakubutsukan-mae," approximately 15 minutes from the train stations.

See also
List of tallest statues

References

Images 

1832 establishments in Japan
1832 sculptures
Buildings and structures in Gifu
Tourist attractions in Gifu Prefecture
Colossal Buddha statues in Japan
Sculptures in Japan